Robert Emmet Barron (born November 19, 1959) is an American prelate of the Catholic Church who has served as bishop of the Diocese of Winona-Rochester since 2022. He is the founder of the Catholic ministerial organization Word on Fire, and was the host of Catholicism, a documentary TV series about Catholicism that aired on PBS. He served as rector at Mundelein Seminary from 2012 to 2015 and as auxiliary bishop for the Archdiocese of Los Angeles from 2015 to 2022.

Barron has published books, essays, and articles on theology and spirituality. He is a religion correspondent for NBC and has also appeared on Fox News, CNN, and EWTN. He has been informally called the "bishop of social media" and the "bishop of the Internet".

, Barron's regular YouTube videos have been viewed over 116 million times; he has over 3 million followers on Facebook, 360,000 on Instagram, and 215,000 on Twitter. In addition, he has been invited to speak about religion at the headquarters of Amazon, Facebook, and Google. He has keynoted several conferences and events over the world, including the 2016 World Youth Day and the 2015 World Meeting of Families.

Barron's 2016 film series, Catholicism: The Pivotal Players, was syndicated for national television in the United States.

Biography

Early life 
Robert Barron was born on November 19, 1959, in Chicago. He is of Irish descent. He spent his childhood first in Detroit, then in the Chicago suburb of Western Springs. His mother was a homemaker, and his father, who died in 1987, was a national sales manager for John Sexton & Company, a national food distributor. He has a sister and a brother, John Barron, who is the Sun-Times Media Group's publisher.

Barron started reading the works of Thomas Aquinas when he was a freshman at Fenwick High School, a private Dominican high school. He transferred to Benet Academy, a private Benedictine high school, where he graduated in 1977.

Barron attended the University of Notre Dame in Notre Dame, Indiana, for a year before transferring to Mundelein Seminary in Mundelein, Illinois. One year later, he was accepted as a Basselin Scholar at the School of Theology of the Catholic University of America in Washington, D.C., where he earned a Bachelor of Philosophy degree in 1981 and a Master of Philosophy degree in 1982; his master's thesis was on the political philosophy of Karl Marx. Barron earned a Licentiate of Sacred Theology from Mundelein Seminary in 1986.

Priesthood 
Barron was ordained to the priesthood for the Archdiocese of Chicago on May 24, 1986, by Cardinal Joseph Bernardin.

After serving as an associate pastor of St. Paul of the Cross Catholic Parish in Park Ridge, Illinois, from 1986 to 1989, he was sent to France and earned a Doctor of Sacred Theology at the Institut Catholique de Paris in 1992. His dissertation was titled "Creation as Discipleship: A Study of the De potentia of Thomas Aquinas in Light of the Dogmatik of Paul Tillich".

In addition to his native English, Barron is fluent in French, Spanish, German, and Latin. Barron is a proponent of Hans Urs von Balthasar's “dare we hope” theology, declaring there is "objective ground" for a "hope that all men may be saved".

From 1992 until 2015, Barron was a professor of systematic theology at University of St. Mary of the Lake, where he was also named the inaugural Francis Cardinal George Professor of Faith and Culture in 2008. He also served as president-rector from 2012 to 2015.

Barron lectured extensively in the United States and internationally, including the Pontifical North American College and the Pontifical University of St. Thomas Aquinas in Rome.  In 2000, Barron launched Word on Fire Catholic Ministries, a non-profit organization, that supports his evangelistic endeavors. Word on Fire programs, featuring Barron, have been broadcast regularly on WGN America, EWTN, Telecare, Relevant Radio and the Word on Fire YouTube Channel. Barron's Word on Fire website offers daily blogs, articles, commentaries and over ten years of weekly sermon podcasts. 

In 2002, Barron was a visiting professor at the University of Notre Dame and at the Pontifical University of St. Thomas Aquinas in 2007. He was also twice scholar-in-residence at the Pontifical North American College, in 2007 and 2010.

Auxiliary Bishop of Los Angeles 

On July 21, 2015, Pope Francis appointed Barron an auxiliary bishop in the Archdiocese of Los Angeles and titular bishop of Macriana in Mauritania. Archbishop José Horacio Gomez noted that Barron's media talent and rapport with young people, as well as his outreach to other faiths would be good for the archdiocese. Archbishop Cupich said he would be of great benefit to the archdiocese.

On September 8, 2015, Barron received his episcopal consecration at the Cathedral of Our Lady of the Angels from Archbishop José H. Gomez. That same month, Barron started a weekly podcast called The Word on Fire Show.

Bishop of Winona-Rochester 
On June 2, 2022, Pope Francis appointed Barron as the ninth bishop of the Diocese of Winona-Rochester, in southern Minnesota. His installation there took place on July 29, 2022, at the Co-Cathedral of St. John the Evangelist in Rochester, Minnesota.

Barron lectures extensively in the United States and internationally and he has published numerous books, essays and DVD programs. He is a frequent commentator  for The Chicago Tribune, NBC Nightly News, Fox News Channel, Our Sunday Visitor, the Catholic Herald (London, UK) and The Catholic New World.

Internet 
Barron's website hosts daily blog posts, weekly articles and video commentaries, and an audio archive of over 500 homilies. Barron has the following social media figures:

 3.1 million+ Facebook followers
 555,000+ YouTube subscribers
 351,000+ Instagram followers
 205,000+ Twitter followers

Videos 
Barron has produced over 1,000 online video commentaries, which have attracted over 84 million views. His weekly productions include brief theological reviews of contemporary culture, including movies, books, music, and current events.

Television

Barron's videos are aired on CatholicTV, EWTN, Telecare, NET TV, and Salt + Light Television. He created a 10-part documentary, Catholicism, filmed in 16 countries, which aired on public television in the United States in  beginning in 2011. A sequel was released in September 2013, titled Catholicism: The New Evangelization.

In October 2010, Barron premiered a half-hour television show, Word on Fire with Father Barron, on WGN America on Sundays. Barron is the first priest since Archbishop Fulton Sheen in the 1950s to have a regular national program on a commercial television network.

Radio/podcast
Barron produces a weekly podcast on faith and culture titled The Word on Fire Show, which has been downloaded over ten million times. His weekly homilies and podcasts air on radio stations around the United States.

Barron has appeared on other podcasts, including the podcasts of Jordan Peterson, Lex Fridman, and Ben Shapiro.

Books
 A Study of the De potentia of Thomas Aquinas in Light of the Dogmatik of Paul Tillich (1993)
 Thomas Aquinas: Spiritual Master (1996)
 And Now I See: A Theology of Transformation (1998)
 Heaven in Stone and Glass (2000)
 The Strangest Way: Walking the Christian Path (2002)
 Bridging the Great Divide: Musings of a Post-Liberal, Post-Conservative, Evangelical Catholic (2004)
 The Priority of Christ: Toward a Post-Liberal Catholicism (2007)
 Word on Fire: Proclaiming the Power of Christ (2008)
 Eucharist (2008)
 Catholicism: A Journey to the Heart of the Faith (2011)
 Seeds of the Word: Finding God in the Culture (2015)
 2 Samuel. Brazos Theological Commentary on the Bible (2015)
 Exploring Catholic Theology: Essays on God, Liturgy, and Evangelization (2015)
 Vibrant Paradoxes: The Both/And of Catholicism (2016)
 To Light a Fire on the Earth: Proclaiming the Gospel in a Secular Age (2017) 
 Arguing Religion: A Bishop Speaks at Facebook and Google (2018)
 Letter to a Suffering Church: A Bishop Speaks on the Sexual Abuse Crisis (2019)
 Centered: The Spirituality of Word on Fire (2020)
 The Pivotal Players: 12 Heroes Who Shaped the Church and Changed the World (2020)
 Renewing Our Hope: Essays for the New Evangelization (2020)
 The Rosary with Bishop Robert Barron (2021)
 Light from Light: A Theological Reflection on the Nicene Creed (2021)
 Redeeming the Time: Gospel Perspectives on the Challenges of the Hour (2022)
 The Great Story of Israel: Election, Freedom, Holiness (2022)

DVDs
Untold Blessings The Three Paths of Holiness (2005)
Conversion (2006)
Faith Clips (2007)
Seven Deadly Sins, Seven Lively Virtues (2007)
Eucharist (2009)
Catholicism (2011)
Catholicism: The New Evangelization (2013)
Priest, Prophet, King (2014)
The Mystery of God (2015)
Catholicism: The Pivotal Players Volume I (2016)
David the King (2017)
The Mass (2018)
Catholicism: The Pivotal Players St. Augustine & St. Benedict (2018)
Catholicism: The Pivotal Players Fulton Sheen & Flannery O'Connor (2019)
The Sacraments (2020)
The Creed (2021)

Distinctions

Orders
 : 
  Order of the Holy Sepulchre

Academic
 2022: Doctor of Humane Letters, Benedictine College
 2019: Doctor of Theology, Pontifical University of St. Thomas Aquinas
 2018: Doctor of Humane Letters,  Assumption College
 2017: Doctor of Divinity, Saint Anselm College
 2016: Doctor of Sacred Theology,  Dominican House of Studies
 2013: Doctor of Religious Education, Providence College
 2012: Doctor of Humanities,  Lewis University

Awards
 2015: Fisher's Net Award for Best Overall and for Best Social Media Presence
 2012: Relevant Radio Christ Brings Hope Award
 2003: Catholic Press Association Book Award: The Strangest Way: Walking the Christian Path
 1998: Catholic Press Association Journalism Award: Best Article - Clergy, Religious, "The Uncanny God"
 1997: Catholic Press Association Book Award: Thomas Aquinas: Spiritual Master
 1995: Catholic Press Association Journalism Award: Best Article - Professional and Special Interest, "Priest as Bearer of the Mystery"

See also

 Catholic Church hierarchy
 Catholic Church in the United States
 Historical list of the Catholic bishops of the United States
 List of Catholic bishops of the United States
 Lists of patriarchs, archbishops, and bishops

References

External links
Roman Catholic Diocese of Winona–Rochester Official Site
Roman Catholic Archdiocese of Los Angeles Official Site
Word on Fire Bishop Robert Barron YouTube channel
 
 

 

1959 births
Living people
20th-century American Roman Catholic priests
21st-century American Roman Catholic titular bishops
American evangelists
20th-century American Roman Catholic theologians
21st-century American Roman Catholic theologians
Benet Academy alumni
Institut Catholique de Paris alumni
Catholic University of America alumni
Academic staff of the Pontifical University of Saint Thomas Aquinas
Systematic theologians
Thomists
University of Notre Dame faculty
University of Saint Mary of the Lake alumni
Members of the Order of the Holy Sepulchre
Bishops appointed by Pope Francis
American Roman Catholic clergy of Irish descent
Roman Catholic bishops of Winona-Rochester